The Paint Bucket Bowl is the name given to the Arkansas State–Memphis football rivalry. It is a college football rivalry between the Arkansas State Red Wolves and the Memphis Tigers.

History
The name of the rivalry was created when officials from the two schools decided to create a trophy for the winner of the game out of some buckets of paint and some paint brushes. The losing school also designed a particular area on its campus that the winner could smear with paint, in an attempt to eliminate the defacing of each campus and the “kidnapping” of opposing football players during game week. The tradition evolved into the winning school being given a trophy from the other—a paint bucket decorated in the colors of the two schools and inscribed with the game score. The two teams have met 61 times on the football field, with Memphis currently holding a 31–24–5 edge in the all-time series. The last meeting between the schools was in 2022. A future meetings in 2023 is scheduled.On May 20, 2020, it was announced that a further four-year extension of the series will begin in 2026.

Game results

See also  
 List of NCAA college football rivalry games

References

College football rivalries in the United States
Arkansas State Red Wolves football
Memphis Tigers football